Don Bosco School, Park Circus is a private, Roman Catholic, English-medium school for boys in Kolkata, West Bengal, India. It was established in 1958 and is part of the Salesians of Don Bosco. It is affiliated to the Council for the Indian School Certificate Examinations.

History 
The Catholic order of Salesians of Don Bosco first came to Calcutta in 1925. In early 1955, the order acquired two large plots of land in the Circus Park area of the city on which to build a school. In September of that year work began on constructing the new school. In November 1957, with the building's completion in sight, Rev. Fr. Charles Dyer was appointed the first Rector and Principal of Don Bosco Park Circus. The school officially opened on 15 January 1958 with an intake of 460 boys. The school now has an enrollment of 3000 students. It celebrated its golden jubilee in 2008, the culmination of a year of festivities which began in March 2007.

The school celebrated its Diamond Jubilee in January 2018, having completed 60 years. The festivities were spread over three days. There was a carnival, an art gallery, performances by alumnus Arko Pravo Mukherjee, the band 'Distorted' (also formed by an alumnus) an all-faith prayer service, a panel discussion by eminent alumni and two shows.

Traditions and houses 
The school's patron saint is St. Dominic Savio, a pupil of St. John Bosco, who died at the age of fourteen and was made a saint on the basis of his having displayed "heroic virtue" in his everyday life.

The school has four houses into which each student is divided. They are named after Salesian Saints. The houses are as follows:
 Bosco House (Blue), named after St. John Bosco, the founder of the Salesian Order
 Rua House (Green), named after Blessed Michael Rua, the first Rector Major of the Salesian
 Savio House (Red), named after St Dominic Savio, the patron Saint of the School
 Francis House (Yellow), named after Francis De Sales, the patron of the Salesians of Don Bosco, and the person after whom the order has been named

Campus 
The campus is dominated by the H-shaped four-storey main school building which has an outer courtyard with the statue of Mary, Mother of Jesus Christ, along with statues of other animals, such as lions and giraffes, and an inner courtyard with a bust of St. John Bosco. In 2013, the school's new library block with further laboratories and classrooms was inaugurated. The campus also has special air-conditioned halls for conducting board examinations seamlessly.

Events 

In addition to its annual celebration of Rabindra Jayanti (the birthday of Rabindranath Tagore), the school hosts several interschool events in Kolkata, the most prominent of which is Bosco Fest. One of Kolkata's oldest inter-school festivals, it is held annually in late July or early August. The fest initially began with just two events—Bosco Beat (an inter-school band event) and Jubilee Quiz (an Inter-school quizzing event). The fest has changed completely and there are more than 16 events, which are organized by several action groups. Some of the events include Bosco Tango, Bosco Enigma and Bosco Jukebox. The fest has its own website and mobile app. Other events also take place throughout the year such as Bosco MUN (Model United Nations), Bosco Bit, Bosco Proscenium and Bosco Polemic. The four houses compete against each other for various intramural events like the patriotic song competition, choral recitation competition and carol singing competition. The school also hosts Bosco mun, one of the biggest muns of kolkata. The business fest bosco empresarios is also hosted by don bosco park circus. annual sports day and rectors and parents day is celebrated with pomp

Twinning and exchange programmes 
Since 2009, the school has established links with the Salesian School, Chertsey, close to London. Thereafter, students from the UK have been visiting Don Bosco School, Park Circus every year. The school has also signed a Memorandum of Understanding with the Goethe Institut for greater collaboration and the teaching of German in school.

Notable alumni 
 Samit Basu, novelist and filmmaker
 Rakesh Gangwal, American billionaire businessman He is one of the founders of IndiGo.
 Amitabha Ghosh, planetary geologist
 Devashish Makhija, filmmaker, screenwriter, graphic artist, fiction writer and poet
 Neel Mukherjee, writer
 Arko Pravo Mukherjee, composer-singer and lyricist
 Aninda Sinha, theoretical physicist
 Anish John, sound engineer
 Subrata Mitra, venture capitalist
 Sujoy Bose , economist & head of National Investment and Infrastructure Fund of India (NIIF)
 Charu Agarwal, scientist & winner of W. Wallace McDowell award (IT Nobel)
 Amit Bagga, scientist & winner of two technical Emmy awards
 Sumit Guha, sound engineer
 Shouvik Guha, quiz master, economist
 Divyanshu Damani, motivational speaker and co-founder of Tagmango

Gallery

References

External links 

 

Private schools in Kolkata
Primary schools in West Bengal
High schools and secondary schools in Kolkata
Boys' schools in India
Salesian secondary schools
Christian schools in West Bengal
Catholic secondary schools in India
Educational institutions established in 1958
1958 establishments in West Bengal